Neurolyga is a genus of wood midges, insects in the family Cecidomyiidae. The 28 described species occur in the holarctic region. The genus was established by Italian entomologist Camillo Rondani in 1840.

Species

Neurolyga acuminata Jaschhof, 2009
Neurolyga angulosa Jaschhof, 2009
Neurolyga bifida (Edwards, 1938)
Neurolyga bilobata (Mamaev & Rozhnova, 1982)
Neurolyga collaris (Mamaev, 1963)
Neurolyga constricta Jaschhof, 2009
Neurolyga degenerans(Mamaev & Mohrig, 1975)
Neurolyga denningi (Pritchard, 1947)
Neurolyga excavata (Yukawa, 1967)
Neurolyga fenestralis Rondani, 1840
Neurolyga hastagera (Mamaev & Rozhnova, 1982)
Neurolyga hyperborea (Mamaev, 1990)
Neurolyga interrupta Jaschhof, 2009
Neurolyga lonsdalensis Jaschhof, 2009
Neurolyga longipes Jaschhof, 1997
†Neurolyga magnifica Nel & Prokop, 2006
Neurolyga ovata Jaschhof, 1996
Neurolyga paludosa Jaschhof, 2009
Neurolyga pritchardi Jaschhof, 1997
Neurolyga semicircula (Bu, 1996)
Neurolyga simillima Jaschhof & Jaschhof, 2020
Neurolyga spinifera (Yukawa, 1971)
Neurolyga subbifida (Mamaev, 1963)
Neurolyga sylvestris (Felt, 1907)
Neurolyga taigensis Jaschhof & Jaschhof, 2020
Neurolyga truncata (Felt, 1912)
Neurolyga venusta (Mamaev & Rozhnova, 1983)
Neurolyga verna (Mamaev, 1963)

References

Cecidomyiidae genera

Taxa named by Camillo Rondani
Insects described in 1840